SA 20 is a Twenty20 franchise cricket tournament in South Africa, organised by Cricket South Africa (CSA) and first contested in 2023. It is contested by six teams based in cities around the country.  The first winners of the tournament were Sunrisers Eastern Cape.

History
Cricket South Africa established the franchise T20 Global League in 2017. The inaugural season was deferred by a year due to the lack of a broadcast deal and title sponsor and in June 2018 was replaced by the Mzansi Super League, a league featuring six CSA-owned teams. Both the leagues became unsuccessful. The MSL ran for only two seasons, the 2020 and 2021 editions being cancelled due to the COVID 19 pandemic.

SA20 was established by CSA in 2022 through a newly formed entity, Africa Cricket Development (Pty) Limited (ACD). CSA is the majority stakeholder in ACD with a 50% share, while broadcaster SuperSport has a 30% share and former Indian Premier League (IPL) Chief Operating Officer Sundar Raman, the remaining 20%. All six of the teams were bought by franchises from the IPL. In July 2022, CSA announced that the One Day International series against Australia due to be played in January 2023 would be cancelled in order for SA20 to go ahead.

In August 2022, Graeme Smith was announced as the commissioner for the tournament. Later in the month, the marquee players for the first season were announced.

Organisation
The six teams play each other twice in the group stages of the competition before the top four sides move to the semi-final stages.

Teams acquire players through an auction as opposed to a draft, making it the second cricket league in the world after the Indian Premier League to do so. Each team purchases a squad of 17 players, with the opportunity of signing up to five players prior to the auction: three international players; one South African international player; and one uncapped South African player.

Teams
The six teams are all owned by existing Indian Premier League franchise owners.

Tournament season and results

Controversy

In July 2022, Hermis Sports Ventures Limited, the owners of Pretoria Mavericks from the now defunct Global T20 League, wrote to CSA asking for a "reasonable opportunity," to submit an application to acquire a franchise in the new tournament, failing which they would consider applying to the courts to issue an interdict to stop the games from going ahead, based on the then CSA CEO Thabang Moroe's assurance that if in the future CSA starts a T20 league, the GLT20 franchise owners will be entitled to ownership of the teams in the new league. However, CSA is confident of seeing off the legal challenge.

References

External links
 

Cricket in South Africa
Twenty20 cricket leagues
South African domestic cricket competitions
Sports leagues established in 2022
Professional cricket leagues
Cricket leagues in South Africa
SA20